Volcanic flight cancellation or volcano airline crisis may refer to:

 2011 Puyehue eruption#Transport disruption, in Chile, Argentina, New Zealand, Australia
 Air travel disruption after the 2011 Grímsvötn eruption, in Iceland, Europe
 Air travel disruption after the 2010 Eyjafjallajökull eruption, in Iceland, Europe
 2010 eruptions of Mount Merapi#Air travel disruption, in Indonesia